Desdunes (Haitian Creole: Dedin) is a commune that is part of the Dessalines Arrondissement in Haiti's Artibonite Department. It is located in the great Artibonite Plain, in the heart of the rice granary of Haiti. The population was 37,027 at the 2015 census. Rice production is the driving force of the local economy.

Zip Code(s) 
HT4440

About 
Desdunes is 86 km (54 miles) from Port-au-Prince while 19 km (12 miles) away from Gonaïves.

Desdunes was formed as a commune by an act of the law of 1983, when it broke away from the town of L'Estère. Long before the town was incorporated, the residents knew the area as "Ti Desdunes". Ti Desdunes was originally the second communal section of Gonaïves; Ti Desdunes also served as a military post for the Gonaïves Arrondissement.

Moreover, the distance between the main part of the town and the Gulf of Gonâve is some 16 km (10 miles). As a matter of fact, people can already see and witness the beauty of the sea when they are in Desdunes.

History 
The town of Desdunes was founded at the time of the French colonization. The Rossignol family owned several industries including cotton and coffee. One of the members of this family, Louis Rossignol Lachicotte Desdunes, owner of a cotton field, gave his name to the commune.

Geography 
Desdunes is located at 19.2894° N, 72.6417° W. The eastern boundary of Desdunes is Route Nationale 1.Desdunes is located at 19.2894° N, 72.6417° W. The eastern boundary of Desdunes is Route Nationale 1.

According to the IHSI, the commune has a total area of 99.49 square kilometers (38.41 square miles), of which 93.37 km² (94%) is rural and suburban and 6.12 square kilometers (6%) is urban. It borders L'Estère to the north, Dessalines to the east, and Grande-Saline on the south.

Under the reign of the National Council of Government led by General Henry Nemphy, was four communal sections.

In December 1990, many changes were made in the administrative structure of the area. The commune of Desdunes became composed of a central agglomeration (Desdunes) and 6 localities scattered on the municipal territory. So, three of the four sections were eliminated (i.e. the first, the third and the fourth sections). Only the second section composed of Grand-Islet and Hatte-Desdunes was allowed to participate in the elections.

Being partly surrounded on the west by coastal wetlands, Desdunes provides opportunities to observe the natural marshes and mangroves that run to Grand-Pierre Bay, which marks the boundary between the coastal plain and the vast Gulf of Gonâve. Many areas in the east part of town have been devoted to agricultural areas.

Desdunes is an essentially agricultural community, but the farmer's tools are extremely rudimentary (the machete and the hoe) and the crops are subject to the vagaries of nature. The drought is frequent there, six, seven or eight months can pass without seeing a drop of rainfall in this desert area.

Desdunes is made up of a number of neighborhoods:

• East of the geographical center of town is Desdunes. Desdunes is four kilometers from L'Estère which can be reached by a path in one hour of walking. It is roughly defined by the Desdunes Canal to the north, Rue Coloniale and Rue l'Hôpital to the east, Avenue Marie-Jeanne, along which runs l'Estère Canal, to the south, and Rue Nouvelle-Desdunes to the west. The zone consists of the Nouvelle-Desdunes, Lakou-Baptiste, Rasta, and Descarreaux neighborhoods.

• Duclos is located at across the canal from the south end of the Nouvelle-Desdunes Road. It is located along the Duclos canal.

Modèl is a settlement in the southwest corner of the commune, near the border with Grande-Saline. Together with Duclos, the two represented Desdunes' original 1st communal section.

• Grand-Islet, coupled with Hatte-Desdunes, formed the 2nd section.

• Aux Sources Sud runs along the banks of Rivière l'Estère. Its northern portion falls between l'Estère River and the l'Estère border line.

• Lagon-Penyen is a community that was once Desdunes' 4th section. This locality, which has a population of 26,952, or 76% of the population the municipality, has the highest concentration of residents in the commune.

Demographics

Neighborhoods

Climate 
The commune of Desdunes enjoys a dry tropical climate, with an average temperature of 26.5 °C (80F°) and low rainfall which does not exceed 700 mm (28 in) per year on average.

This climate is characterized by two seasons:

• A dry season that runs from November to March with temperatures fluctuating around 25 °C (77°F) in the dry season and very low rainfall reaching its lowest level in January with an average of 6 mm (0.25 in).

• A rainy season that extends from April to October, temperatures of about 28 °C (82°F) and higher rainfall levels, reaching their highest level during the month of June with an average of 98 mm (3.8 in).

These climatic conditions can be explained by the location of the commune, located west of the Montagnes Noires and south of the Massif du Nord; clouds from the Atlantic Ocean, which are loaded with water, are discharging on the slopes to the east and north of these mountains because they are driven by the wind. (trade winds from NE to SW). By meeting these mountains, clouds must rise at altitude, and then meet conditions of lower temperatures and pressures which this the phenomenon of condensation and precipitation; the other next to these mountains, where the commune of Desdunes is located, the air is now devoid of moisture and rainfall is therefore weak.

Hydrographic Network

In addition to these difficult weather conditions, the municipality is characterized by a relatively poor natural hydrographic network, marked by the Rivière l'Estère and its tributaries. These are powered by rainfall that waters the Montagnes Noires located east of the town. The relief forms a watershed which directs the runoff water towards watercourses that supply the L'Estère River, which is oriented east-west and marks the boundary between the commune of Desdunes and the commune of L'Estère;

The municipality also benefits from an artificial channel for the diversion of the River Artibonite, which allows for irrigation of acres of the lands of the commune.

This natural hydrographic network leads to the sea at Baie de la Tortue (Turtle Bay), with an average flow of less than 3 m3 / s. However, the municipality also benefits from an important network of artificial channels, powered by the rivers of Estère and Artibonite (Haiti's fastest flowing river at 99 m3 / s), crossing the whole commune of Desdunes from east to west to open in the Bay of Grande Pierre.

The commune, located on the plain of Artibonite, is characterized at a very low altitude (about 8 meters (26 feet) above sea level), by the absence of relief, and by the presence of flood zones and mangrove swamps that form a buffer area between sea and land. The plain itself is, however, surrounded by large mountain ranges: The Chaine des Matheux to the south, the Black Mountains to the east and the Massif du Nord to the northeast.

Soils

The soils of the commune are relatively poor, and correspond, in the best case to 5th grade soils, i.e. soils suitable for pasture and rice cultivation, offer high productivity with adequate layout; this- during, they are not able to accommodate other types of cultures, as the upper soil classes (from 1 to 4). These 5th category soils cover an area of 4009 hectares (15.5 sq.mi) located in the eastern part of the commune. These soils are affected in a general way by a process of salinization that impoverishes them.

The 6th category soils, located in the center of the commune and covering 197 hectares (0.75 sq.mi) are soils to be dedicated to forest and pasture areas; these soils are very limited for agricultural activities because of their low depth and roughness.

Soils of the 7th category cover area of 2015 hectares (7.77 sq.mi) and are mainly based on the central area of the commune; these soils are not culturable and should only be intended for restières. Finally, the 8th category soils cover as for them a surface of 3628 hectares and are located exclusively on the fringe west of the town, near the sea; these soils, located in the mangrove area and swamps, should only be used for environmental protection and can not welcome production activity- agricultural or forestry.

With regard to climatic hazards, the commune of Desdunes is primarily concerned mainly by the hazard of rainfall, which can cause floods and droughts. Due to its geographical location, located we have a vast plain and especially downstream of productive soil.

Climate and Topography

The climate of the area is tropical dry. The seasons are marked by drought. During the dry season, the rainfall varies between 50 and 100 mm. The desertification is total. Access to clean water is a real problem in Desdunes. There is no source or river in the area. Only a canal runs along the town on the southern edge, but the people wash there, do their laundry, and the animals drink from it. In the dry season, the canal is dry. The grimacing spectrum of starvation is real in this area.

The plain of Artibonite (125 000 ha) (or 483 sq. mi.) is the country's real grain store. It opens to the sea to the west and the mountains (500 to 1000 m altitude) to the east. This vast plain extends at an average altitude of 8 m below sea level. The soil geology is generally calcareous (high in calcium) of alluvial type (considered the most fertile) very deep (1.5 m) and strongly argillaceous (consisting of clay minerals). This type of land is favorable to rice growing.

Economy 
Regarding the Economic and Financial Institutions, there are no banks in the municipality. The Desduniens go to other communes to carry out banking operations. However, there are three restaurants, a credit union and a marketing cooperative.

Due to persistent drought and lack of water supply, the soil is uncultivated. The residents of Desdunes rent their services seasonally in the rice fields in L'Estère. The population is chronically confronted with periods of low availability of food. This persistent shortage has impoverished the population, which ultimately has no other solution than leaving the village in search of food or a hypothetical job in the big cities. Goat farming is almost non-existent; when it is practiced, it is at the family level. The economic activities are graffiti activities which make it very difficult to vital minimum of this marginalized population. Therefore, the question of savings does not arise even not because, can not give guarantees, people have no hope of access to banking services traditional.

Infrastructure 
Because the town of Desdunes is so small, the supply of clean water and basic medical services are not enough for the residents. Given this, various organizations are working to provide the necessary assistance to the townspeople. The Operation Blessing International's local arm called Operation Blessing Haiti Relief is just one of the groups helping Desdunes. The organization reached out to Desdunes residents last year, when they launched a clean drinking water and medical program. Under the program, residents received free supply of clean water, as well as medical assistance in a span of 10 days.

Transportation

In terms of road infrastructure, Desdunes is connected to L'Estère, the closest city, about four kilometers away, by a dirt road. Walking remains the primary means of locomotion of the population.

Education

The Ministry of National Education of Youth and Sports is not represented in the commune of Desdunes. In the field of education, a large percentage of men and women do not know neither read nor write, and most children are not in school. A presbyteral school and three small community schools (public schools) accommodate between 100 and 250 children. The school annexed to Good Samaritan Nutrition Center welcomes around 360 students, from kindergarten to sixth grade.

Health

The Ministry of Public Health and Population is not represented in the municipality of Desdunes, however there are two health centers with beds and a clinic. In addition, two doctors and five auxiliaries provide sanitary services at commune level.

Other assistance programs are still being conducted in the town. Some of these programs involve treatments and preventive measures against various health issues such as tropical diseases and cholera. In-kind Donation of Safe Motherhood Kits, as well as Rapid Response Mechanism, are also among the programs rolled out in the small town.

Utilities

As for water availability, one river was counted at the commune level. For the other points of water there are public fountains with nearly 210 taps. Regarding electricity, only the city has electricity. This service is provided by the Electricity of Haiti (EDH).

Security

With regard to Administrative and Judiciary Infrastructures, the municipality has a court of peace and a police station. There is one prison in the commune of Desdunes.

Socio-economic 
The analysis of the socio-economic realities of Desdunes eloquently testifies to the need to put in place structures that can help people take charge to become actors in their own development and development of the local community as a whole. Periods of scarcity are particularly felt by children. Delays in growth are the result of protein-energy malnutrition and also of specific deficiencies in micronutrients. The Good Samaritain nutrition center, initiated in November 2004, offers the possibility for children to receive a balanced healthy meal a day, to be medically followed by doctor and a health assistant. Like growth, other physical functions are affected: disease resistance, work capacity, breastfeeding and pregnancy. It is why, the center benefits from visits to give mothers advice in the field of health, hygiene and nutrition. As part of the autonomy of the center, a vegetable garden was initiated to produce part of vegetables used to feed the children of the nutrition center; the surplus is sold to the market so to generate profits allowing the reinvestment in the seeds and the self-financing of the center. Feeding the children was urgent and vital. But once the center is up and running, we have seemed important to broaden our scope. That's why, in order to give children a quality education, a school, first of all kindergarten and then primary school, which is now home to around 365 children, girls and boys, aged 2.5 to 12–13 years old. It is important to know that since the opening of the Nutrition Center in 2004, followed by the whole projects initiated from this center (small goat farm, vegetable garden, school, medical follow-up children, drinking water station for the village), the population that had left the area took awareness that something important was happening in the village. This is how the diaspora in New York mobilized to buy poles and electrical cables to bring electricity from L'Estère into the village. Similarly, we see that people who had deserted the area now come back to settle there. Micro-manufacturing companies of rice straw briquettes are growing in the village, in order to replace the charcoal.

Culture 
Religion

The population practices several types of worship, mainly Catholics, Protestants, and douisants. According to the data of the IHSI, there would be 65 peristyles in the commune of Desdunes. Protestantism (41%) and Vodun (40%) are the religions most frequently performed according to the actual survey fielded by the GAFE; the Catholic religion is practiced by 17% of the population.

More than 26 temples of all beliefs have been enumerated in the commune. These temples are divided into Catholic, Baptist, Adventist, Pentecostal and Jehovah's Witness.

Organizations

There are four popular organizations, four peasant groups, two women's groups and an international organization

Communication

The town of Desdunes has no newspaper / magazine or television station. However, there are multiple radio stations.

Leisure

As for leisure, the town of Desdunes is very deprived. There are five gagères and a football (soccer) pitch, considered as a simple play area. For the cultural heritages, there are no monuments and sites.

The town celebrates the feast of patron saint, Saint Peter, the 29th of June of each year.

References

Populated places in Artibonite (department)
Communes of Haiti